Our Bodies Our Selves is the fifth album by the Berkeley, California punk rock band The Mr. T Experience, released in 1993 by Lookout! Records. It was the band's first album as a three-piece, after the departure of founding guitarist Jon Von Zelowitz the previous year. It was also their last album with bassist Aaron Rubin and founding drummer Alex Laipeneiks. After their departures, vocalist/guitarist Dr. Frank re-formed the band with a new lineup.

The song "Even Hitler Had a Girlfriend" was used in the soundtrack to the 1996 movie Glory Daze starring Ben Affleck and was included on the film's soundtrack album, along with the song "I Just Wanna Do it With You" from the band's 1996 album Love is Dead. During the film's party scene, the main characters also perform as a band a cover of The Mr. T Experience song "Now We Are Twenty-One" from their 1988 album Night Shift at the Thrill Factory. The song “More Than Toast” was included on the soundtrack of EA Sports NCAA Football06.

Track listing

Personnel
Dr. Frank – vocals, guitar
Aaron Rubin – bass
Alex Laipeneiks – drums

Technical
Kevin Army - produced, engineer, mixing
John Golden - mastering
Tom Robinson - band photography
Sergie Graphics - art
Aaron Laipeneiks - art

The Mr. T Experience albums
1993 albums